Montluçon – Guéret Airport  is an airport in Lépaud, a commune in the Creuse department of the Nouvelle-Aquitaine region of France.

Facilities

Statistics

References

In August 2021 the airport hosted three classes of the World Gliding Championships

External links
 
 

Airports in Nouvelle-Aquitaine
Buildings and structures in Creuse
Airports established in 1982
1982 establishments in France